Gert Hofmann (29 January 1931 – 1 July 1993) was a German writer and professor of German literature.

Life

Hofmann was born and grew up in Limbach, Saxony (Germany) which, after World War II, became part of East Germany. In 1948, he moved with his family to Leipzig. There, he attended a school for translators and interpreters, studying English and Russian. In 1950, he enrolled to Leipzig University, where he studied Romance languages and Slavic languages. In 1951, he fled from the German Democratic Republic and settled in Freiburg im Breisgau, where he continued his studies. In 1957, he graduated with a thesis on Henry James.

Hofmann began his writing career as a writer of radio plays. After one year as a research assistant at the University of Freiburg, he left Germany in 1961 for Bristol to teach German literature. Over the next ten years he taught at universities in Europe in Toulouse, Paris, Edinburgh, and in the United States at New Haven, Berkeley, California and Austin.

From 1971 to 1980 he lived in the southern Austrian town of Klagenfurt, while teaching at the University of Ljubljana in Slovenia, former Yugoslavia.

In 1980, aged 49, he returned to Germany, moving to Erding near Munich, becoming a novelist. He died of a stroke in 1993.

Honors
Hofmann received several literary awards during his lifetime including the Ingeborg-Bachmann-Preis (1979), the Alfred-Döblin-Preis (1982), the Hörspielpreis der Kriegsblinden (1983). 
In 1987, he became a member of the Deutsche Akademie für Sprache und Dichtung in Darmstadt.
He received the Literaturpreis der Stadt München in 1993.

Works
A number of Hofmann's works have been translated by his son, the poet Michael Hofmann (*1957 in Freiburg). 
Die Denunziation(1979) and Veilchenfeld(1986) are concerned with The Holocaust.

 Interpretationsprobleme bei Henry James, (1957)
 Der Bürgermeister, (1963)
 Der Sohn, (1966)
 Kündigungen, (1969)
 Our Man in Madras, (1969), (short film version 2014)
 Advokat Patelin, (1976)
 Die Denunziation, (1979)
 Die Fistelstimme, (1980)
 Fuhlrotts Vergeßlichkeit. Portrait eines uns bekannten Kopfes, (1981)
 Gespräch über Balzacs Pferd, (Trans. Balzac's Horse and Other Stories) (1981, Trans. 1989)
 Die Überflutung (1981)
 Auf dem Turm (Trans. The Spectacle at the Tower) (1982, Trans. 1989)
 Die Rückkehr des verlorenen Jakob Michael Reinhold Lenz nach Riga, (1984)
 Unsere Eroberung (Trans. Our Conquest), (1984, Trans. 1991)
 Der Blindensturz (Trans. The Parable of the Blind), (1985, Trans. 1989)
 Veilchenfeld (1986)
 Die Weltmaschine, (1986)
 Casanova und die Figurantin, (1987)
 Unsere Vergeßlichkeit (1987)
 Vor der Regenzeit, (Trans. Before the Rainy Season), (1988, Trans. 1992)
 Der Kinoerzähler (Trans. The Film Explainer), (1990, Trans. 1996)
 Tolstois Kopf, (1991)
 Das Glück (Trans. Luck), (1992, Trans. 2004)
 Das Thema kommt, verbeugt sich, sagt: Wie wär's?, (1992)
 Die kleine Stechardin (1994) (Trans. Lichtenberg and the Little Flower Girl,'' Michael Hofmann, 2004)

See also
 The Holocaust in popular culture

References

Leipzig University alumni
University of Freiburg alumni
Academic staff of the University of Ljubljana
Academic staff of the University of Toulouse
Academic staff of the University of Paris
University of California, Berkeley faculty
University of Texas at Austin faculty
1931 births
1993 deaths
Ingeborg Bachmann Prize winners
20th-century German novelists
20th-century German male writers